Undercover is a 1943 British war film produced by Ealing Studios, originally titled Chetnik. It was filmed in Wales and released on 27 July 1943. Its subject is a guerrilla movement in German-occupied Yugoslavia, loosely based on Draza Mihailovich's Chetnik resistance movement.

The film was produced by Michael Balcon and directed by Sergei Nolbandov. It stars John Clements, Mary Morris, and Stephen Murray, with Michael Wilding and 15-year-old Stanley Baker.

The film was released in the United States in 1944 by Columbia Pictures under the title Underground Guerrillas. It is similar to the 20th Century Fox wartime film Chetniks! The Fighting Guerrillas (1943), made in the U.S.

Background
The film is based on the Yugoslav resistance movement under the command of General Draza Mihailovich. But politics overtook the situation because Mihailovich and the Royalists were about to be abandoned by the British government - as parts of the Chetnik movement co-operated with the Nazis - in favour of the Communist and Stalinist leader Josip Broz Tito. Speaking in Parliament on 22 February 1944, the Prime Minister, Winston Churchill, said: "General Mihailovic, I much regret to say, drifted gradually into a position where his commanders made accommodations with Italian and German troops…"  The screenplay, by John Dighton and Monja Danischewsky, was accordingly amended, and the film was re-edited. It ended up as a black and white war film, 80 minutes in length.

Plot
 The film focuses on the fictional Petrovitch family in Belgrade, Serbia. One brother, Milosh, a Yugoslav military captain (John Clements) forms an anti-Nazi guerilla movement in the mountains of Serbia. His brother, Dr. Stephan Petrovitch (Stephen Murray), poses as a Nazi collaborator to obtain information for the guerrillas while working directly under General von Staengel (Godfrey Tearle), commander of the German occupation force.

Using information obtained by Stephan, Milosh and his guerrillas are able to ambush a German train and free Yugoslav PoWs, while wounding General Staengel in the process. Stephan operates on the wounded General, saving his life, and gaining the General's trust. Milosh's wife, Anna Petrovitch (Mary Morris), a schoolteacher, is taken prisoner and interrogated, but she escapes, with the help of some of her students, and joins Milosh in the mountains. In retaliation, German troops under Colonel von Brock (Robert Harris) execute six schoolchildren.

Later, Stephan uses his credentials as a Nazi sympathizer to plant explosives on a German train, timing them to go off in a mountain tunnel. The film's climax is a pitched battle between the Germans and guerrillas. Afterwards, the Serbians retreat into the mountains to continue their campaign of terror and resistance against Axis occupation.

Cast

 John Clements as Milosh Petrovitch
 Mary Morris as Anna Petrovitch
 Stephen Murray as Dr. Stephan Petrovitch
 Tom Walls as Kossan Petrovitch
 Rachel Thomas as Maria Petrovitch
 Michael Wilding as Constantine
 Stanley Baker as Petar
 Godfrey Tearle as General von Staengel
 Robert Harris as Colonel von Brock
 Niall MacGinnis as Dr. Jordan
 Ivor Barnard as Stationmaster
 Terwyn Jones as Danilo
 Finlay Currie as Priest
 Ben Williams as Dragutin

Crew
 Director: Sergei Nolbandov
 Producer: Michael Balcon
 Associate Producer: S.C. Balcon
 Script: John Dighton, Monja Danischewsky, Sergei Nolbandov (uncredited), and Milosh Sekulich (uncredited). Based on a story by George Slocombe, Milosh Sekulich (uncredited), and Sergei Nolbandov (uncredited)
 Cinematography: Wilkie Cooper
 Art Direction: Duncan Sutherland
 Editing: Eileen Boland
 Supervising Editor: Sidney Cole
 Special Effects: Roy Kellino
 Technical Advisors: Milosh Sekulich, W.E. Hart
 Music: Frederic Austin

Sources 
 Barr, Charles. Ealing Studios: A Movie Book. Berkeley, CA: University of California Press, 1999.
 Barr, Charles. (1974). "Projecting Britain and the British Character: Ealing Studios, Part II." Screen, 15(2), pages 129-163.
 Dick, Bernard F. The Star-Spangled Screen: The American World War II Film. Lexington, KY: University Press of Kentucky, 2006. p. 164.
 Undercover on the citwf database: http://www.citwf.com/film365195.htm

External links
 

1943 films
1943 war films
British war films
1940s English-language films
Films directed by Sergei Nolbandov
Films set in Serbia
Films set in Belgrade
Ealing Studios films
War films set in Partisan Yugoslavia
World War II films made in wartime
Films produced by Michael Balcon
British black-and-white films
History of Serbia on film
Cultural depictions of Serbian men
Cultural depictions of Serbian people
Guerrilla warfare in film